Progressive Democratic Front may refer to:
Progressive Democratic Front (Kerala), India  
Progressive Democratic Front (Uttarakhand), India 
Republican Progressive Democratic Front, Italy

See also
Democratic Front (disambiguation)